Authors Alliance is a non-profit organization based in Berkeley, California that facilitates widespread access to works of authorship by assisting and representing authors who want to disseminate knowledge and products of the imagination broadly.

Main issues

The Authors Alliance's main issues are Managing Authors' Rights, Authorship Law & Policy, Reaching Audiences, and Authorial Reputation & Integrity.

Rights reversion

The Author's Alliance has released a how-to guide on authors' rights reversion, "Understanding Rights Reversion: When, Why & How to Regain Copyright and Make Your Book More Available," a guide that arms authors with the information and strategies they need to revive their books, authored by Nicole Cabrera, Jordyn Ostroff and Brianna Schofield.

See also
 List of works available under a Creative Commons license

References

External links

 

Computer law organizations
Copyleft
Copyright law organizations
Intellectual property organizations
Organizations established in 2014
501(c)(3) organizations
Organizations based in Culver City, California